The True Nature of Bernadette is a 1972 Canadian drama film directed by Gilles Carle. It was entered into the 1972 Cannes Film Festival. The film was also selected as the Canadian entry for the Best Foreign Language Film at the 45th Academy Awards, but was not accepted as a nominee. In 1984 the Toronto International Film Festival ranked the film tenth in the Top 10 Canadian Films of All Time.<ref>"Top 10 Canadian Films of All Time ," The Canadian Encyclopedia, 2012, URL accessed 28 April 2013.</ref> The film won Canadian Film Awards for Director, Actress (Micheline Lanctôt), Supporting Actor (Donald Pilon) and Musical Score.

Plot
A Montreal housewife leaves her husband and comfortable home in order to practice vegetarianism and free love, which she finds in a Quebec farm.

Cast
 Micheline Lanctôt as Bernadette
 Donald Pilon as Thomas
 Reynald Bouchard as Rock
 Robert Rivard as Felicien, le maire
 Willie Lamothe as Antoine, le postier
 Maurice Beaupré as Octave
 Ernest Guimond as Moise
 Julien Lippé as Auguste
 Claudette Delorimier as Madeleine
 Pierre Valcour as Courchesne
 Yvon Barrette as St-Luc
 Yves Allaire as St-Marc
 Yannick Therrien as Yannick
 Gilles Lajoie as Napoleon

Production
The film was shot from 18 October to 29 November 1971.

ReleaseThe True Nature of Bernadette and A Fan's Notes'' were the first privately-funded Canadian films shown at the Cannes Film Festival. The film was theatrically released on 6 May 1972, in Montreal. The film was seen by 282,992 people in France.

See also
 List of submissions to the 45th Academy Awards for Best Foreign Language Film
 List of Canadian submissions for the Academy Award for Best Foreign Language Film

References

Works cited

External links

1972 films
1970s French-language films
1972 drama films
Films directed by Gilles Carle
Films set in Quebec
Films scored by Pierre F. Brault
Canadian drama films
French-language Canadian films
1970s Canadian films